I Wanna Be Free is the seventeenth solo studio album by American country music singer-songwriter Loretta Lynn. It was released on May 3, 1971, by Decca Records.

Critical reception

In the issue dated May 22, 1971, Billboard published a review which said, "Miss Lynn's latest album spotlights her current country hit, "I Wanna Be Free", and features excellent versions of "Help Me Make It Through the Night", "Me and Bobby McGee" and "Rose Garden". Among the originals, "Drive You Out of My Mind" and "I'm One Man's Woman" stand out.

Cashbox published a review in the May 15, 1971 issue which said, "The most difficult thing for a popular recording artist to do is to maintain his or her popularity via records and live appearances. Loretta Lynn has found that to be no task at all. In fact, as the years pass, she becomes more popular. "I Wanna Be Free" is the title of Loretta's latest chart single, and this album of the same name is likely to soar to the top of the country charts as fast as the single. "Me and Bobby McGee", "When You're Poor", "See That Mountain", and "Put Your Hand in the Hand" are included."

Commercial performance 
The album peaked at No. 5 on the US Billboard Hot Country LP's chart and No. 110 on the US Billboard Top LP's chart.

The album's only single, "I Wanna Be Free", was released in February 1971 and peaked at No. 3 on the US Billboard Hot Country Singles chart and No. 94 on the US Billboard Hot 100 chart. In Canada, the single peaked at No. 1 on the RPM Country Singles chart.

Recording 
Recording sessions for the album began on November 25, 1970, at Bradley's Barn in Mount Juliet, Tennessee. Two additional sessions followed on March 29 and March 30, 1971. Four songs on the album were recorded during earlier sessions for other albums. "I'm One Man's Woman" was recorded on May 14, 1969, during sessions for 1969's Woman of the World/To Make a Man. "Drive You Out of My Mind" was recorded during the October 2, 1969 session for 1970's Here's Loretta Singing "Wings Upon Your Horns". "If I Never Love Again (It Will Be Too Soon)" and "When You Leave My World" were recorded during sessions for 1971's Coal Miner's Daughter, on April 9 and July 14, 1970, respectively.

Track listing

Personnel
Adapted from the album liner notes and Decca recording session records.
Harold Bradley – electric bass guitar
Owen Bradley – producer
Ray Edenton – guitar, acoustic guitar
Buddy Harman – drums
Junior Huskey – bass
Darrell Johnson – mastering
The Jordanaires – background vocals
Loretta Lynn – lead vocals
Grady Martin – guitar, lead electric guitar
Bob Moore – bass
Hargus Robbins – piano
Hal Rugg – steel guitar, dobro
Dale Sellars – guitar
Bob Thompson – banjo
Pete Wade – guitar
Teddy Wilburn – liner notes

Charts 
Album

Singles

References 

1971 albums
Loretta Lynn albums
Albums produced by Owen Bradley
Decca Records albums